The 2015 Zamfara State gubernatorial election was the 5th gubernatorial election of Zamfara State. Held on April 11, 2015, the All Progressives Congress nominee Abdul'aziz Abubakar Yari won the election, defeating Mamuda Aliyu Shinkafi of the People's Democratic Party.

APC primary
APC candidate, Abdul'aziz Abubakar Yari clinched the party ticket. The APC primary election was held in 2014.

PDP primary
PDP candidate, Mamuda Aliyu Shinkafi clinched the party ticket. The PDP primary election was held in 2014.

Results 
A total of 20 candidates contested in the election. Abdul'aziz Abubakar Yari from the All Progressives Congress won the election, defeating Mamuda Aliyu Shinkafi from the People's Democratic Party.

References 

Zamfara State gubernatorial elections
Zamfara gubernatorial
April 2015 events in Nigeria